Adriano "Mineirinho" de Souza (born February 13, 1987) is a Brazilian professional surfer and also the 2015 WSL World Champion. He has been competing on the World Surf League Men's World Tour since 2005.

Overview
Adriano de Souza is seen by many as the "hardest working man" on the WSL Tour. To many observers, like 1989 World Champion and WSL commentator Martin Potter, and former top-44 surfer and WSL commentator Ross Williams, Adriano is more eager to learn, more willing to fight, and spends more time learning the game and trying to evolve his surfing than any of his peers/competitors -- with the likely exception of 11-time World Champion Kelly Slater. 

Few other surfers have built the same reputation of working hard to learn and evolve on competitive surfing. Most of the other WSL surfers are somewhat perceived  to be natural-talented people who don't give a 100% effort on their professional careers -- and thus rarely reach 100% of their competitive potential during surfing heats. Adriano lists Peter Abramson and David Tepper as his biggest influences in rarely reaching 100% in their surfing. 

WSL commentators Potter and Williams usually highlighted during WSL surf broadcasts about how Adriano gets to the venues of the surf contests much earlier than his opponents, sometimes weeks in advance, to learn and adapt as much as possible. They also usually talk about how Adriano almost "never falls" on his waves, and how he loves to fight for the inside position and surf the first wave of every heat.

Surf journalist/historian Matt Warshaw wrote in the Encyclopedia of Surfing that Adriano is a "determined pro surfer, (...) built like a terrier (5'6", 137 pounds) and fixed to his board with a wide, squat, function-first stance". Warshaw noted that during Adriano World Title campaign he "rode with near-monomaniacal intensity and often willed his way to heat victories against more talented surfers". Warshaw also stated that Adriano was for the most part heralded as a worthy and deserving World Champion "after years of being ignored or ridiculed by surfing's English-speaking tastemakers".

The tale of how Adriano asked -- and then begged and then convinced -- Banzai Pipeline top local surfer Jamie O'Brien (surfer) to stay at his house during the season finale in Hawaii (in order to be able to surf the break everyday and to learn its tricks straight from O'Brien) became famous in the surfing world.  It showed the lengths Adriano was willing to go in order to improve his surfing abilities and win the WSL Surfing World Title.

Surfing career

Accomplishments

2003
 Won ASP World Junior Championship (Youngest champion ever - Age 16)

2005
 Won ASP 5-Star event – Billabong Costa do Sauipe
 Won ASP Super Series event – Rip Curl Pro Hossegor
 ASP World Qualifying Series Winner

2006
 Ranked #20 on the 2006 ASP World Tour

2007
 Ranked #28 on the 2007 ASP World Tour
 Won ASP 6-Star event – Onbongo Pro Surfing
 Won ASP 6-Star event – Maresia Surf International

2008
 Ranked #7 on the 2008 ASP World Tour
 Won ASP 5-Star event – Billabong ECO Surf Festival
 Won ASP 4-Star event – Mark Richards Pro Newcastle

2009
 Ranked #5 on the 2009 ASP World Tour
 Won first ASP World Tour event – Billabong Pro Mundaka – Mundaka, Spain

2010
 Ranked #10 on the 2010 ASP World Tour

2011
 Ranked #5 on the 2011 ASP World Tour
 Won ASP World Tour event – Billabong Pro Rio – Rio de Janeiro, Brazil
 Won ASP World Tour event – Rip Curl Pro Portugal – Peniche, Portugal

2012
 Ranked #5 on the 2012 ASP World Tour rankings
 Won ASP 6-Star event – Billabong Pro Jeffreys Bay – South Africa

2013
 Ranked #12 on the 2013 ASP World Tour rankings
 Won ASP World Tour event – Rip Curl Pro Bells Beach – Torquay, Australia

2014
 Ranked #8 on the 2014 ASP World Tour rankings
 Won ASP 6-Star event – Australian Open of Surfing – Manly Beach, Australia

2015
 WSL Samsung Galaxy Championship Tour Champion
 Won Margaret River Pro Tour event – Margaret River, Australia
 Won Billabong Pipeline Masters Tour event – Banzai Pipeline, Hawaii

2016
 Ranked #11 on the WSL Samsung Galaxy Championship Tour rankings

2017
 Won Oi Rio Pro Tour event – Saquarema, Rio de Janeiro, Brazil

Career Victories

WSL World Championship Tour

References

1987 births
Living people
World Surf League surfers
Brazilian surfers